If These Walls Could Sing is a 2022 British documentary film directed by Mary McCartney, in her feature documentary debut, about the history of Abbey Road Studios in London and the experiences and memories of the musicians who have played there. Produced by John Battsek,
the documentary formed a centrepiece of Abbey Road Studios’ 90th anniversary celebrations in November 2022.

Cast
 John Williams as himself 
 Paul McCartney as himself 
 Ringo Starr as himself
 Elton John as himself 
 Jimmy Page as himself 
 Noel Gallagher as himself 
 Liam Gallagher as himself 
 Roger Waters as himself 
 David Gilmour as himself 
 Nick Mason as himself 
 Cliff Richard as himself 
 Celeste as herself
 Giles Martin as himself
 George Lucas as himself 
 Sheku Kanneh-Mason as himself
 Tony Hicks as himself 
 Bobby Elliott as himself
 Baba Ani as himself
 Colette Barber as herself
 Nile Rodgers as himself
 Ashaine White as herself
 Matilda Mann as herself

Production
It was announced in January 2021 that Mary McCartney was to direct a documentary about Abbey Road Studios. McCartney said "some of my earliest memories as a young child come from time spent at Abbey Road, I’ve long wanted to tell the story of this historic place." As well as her father Paul McCartney, contributions are reported to be from Jimmy Page, Kate Bush, Noel Gallagher, Liam Gallagher, Pink Floyd, John Williams, Celeste, Elton John, Giles Martin, and Shirley Bassey. Production is by Mercury Studios and Ventureland. McCartney said what she "wanted from the interviews was to drill down into those musicians really feel about Abbey Road. 'Do you really care about Abbey Road? It's a building and you recorded here, but whatever. Do you really care?' And I think from the interviews, you can really see they are thinking fondly about it."

Release
The film had its world premiere at the 49th Telluride Film Festival in September 2022. It was made available to stream on Disney+ in the United States on December 16, 2022 and on Hulu on December 23, 2022. It was released on Disney+ in the UK on January 6, 2023.

Reception
Peter Bradshaw in The Guardian describes it an "enjoyable" documentary and a "diverting private tour" emphasising the studio use not only for pop and rock music but for Elgar, the cellist Jacqueline du Pre, the London Symphony Orchestra and film projects from John Williams, George Lucas and Steven Spielberg. Chris Harvey in The Daily Telegraph describes "an astonishing line-up of interviewees" which provide an account "rich with details" and "a heart-stopping moment when George Martin's son Giles plays the original tapes of John Lennon's vocals for "A Day in the Life"." Peter Aspden in the Financial Times described it as "charming, but not hugely revealing… put together with visual flair, in a shamelessly nostalgic tone."

References

External links
 

2022 films
2022 documentary films
2020s British films
2020s English-language films
British documentary films
Documentary films about singers
Documentary films about the music industry
Documentary films about the Beatles
Disney documentary films
Disney+ original films